Empire is a census-designated place (CDP) in Plaquemines Parish, Louisiana, United States.  The population was 905 at the 2020 census.

Seafood production

Empire, along with Venice, is the third largest seafood port in the United States by weight and value(Landings by Port Ranked by Pounds, NOAA, 2016). Some two thousand boats home port from Empire. Species landed include oysters, shrimp, menhaden, and other types of fin fish. During the BP oil spill, seafood landings came to a halt. Oyster landings did not resume for an entire year. Under the Coast 2050 plan, a 50,000 cfs freshwater diversion is proposed at Empire, which threatens the livelihood of the fishermen and the supporting businesses by drastically altering the salinity in the surrounding marshes.

Hurricane Katrina

During the afternoon of August 28, 2005, Hurricane Katrina approached the northern coastline of the Gulf of Mexico, generating tropical force winds along coastal areas of Florida, Alabama, Mississippi and Louisiana. At 6:10 a.m., on August 29, 2005, Katrina made landfall just a few miles southeast of Empire, at Buras-Triumph. Many shrimp and oyster boats were grounded along the roads and levees near Empire. On the morning of August 29, the eye of the storm passed over Empire. The area was entirely flooded, causing dozens of boats that had popped their moorings to settle near the southern foot of the Empire High Rise Bridge. As a result, all traffic coming into or out of southern Plaquemines Parish was routed over the draw bridge on Parish Highway 11 (the old alignment of Louisiana Highway 23). Many notable businesses such as Tom's Place Oyster Bar and The Delta Marina were destroyed.

Geography

Demographics

References

External links
 Louisiana road map of major roads: LA-roadmap.

Census-designated places in Louisiana
Census-designated places in Plaquemines Parish, Louisiana
Census-designated places in New Orleans metropolitan area
Louisiana populated places on the Mississippi River